The Powerpuff Girls is an American animated television series and media franchise created by animator Craig McCracken and produced by Hanna-Barbera (later Cartoon Network Studios). The series centers on Blossom, Bubbles, and Buttercup, three genetically engineered little girls with superpowers. The girls live in the fictional city of Townsville with their father and creator, the scientist Professor Drake Utonium, where-in they are frequently called upon by the city's mayor in order to help fight criminals and other enemies using their powers.

The Powerpuff Girls franchise has received widespread critical acclaim, winning two Emmy Awards and two Annie Awards. It consists primarily of four television series and one film, the latter of which aired between November 1998 and March 2005. Spanning twenty-three years, it is Cartoon Network's longest-running franchise to date. There is also The Powerpuff Girls toy line manufactured by Trendmasters for the first two series and Spin Master for the 2016 reboot. 

Three 44-minute specials based on the series have been released: The Powerpuff Girls: Twas the Fight Before Christmas, The Powerpuff Girls Rule!!!, and Powerpuff Girls: Dance Pantsed, while a crossover with Teen Titans Go! and the 2016 series was also developed.

Television series

The Powerpuff Girls (1998–2005)

Craig McCracken originally developed The Powerpuff Girls in 1992 as a cartoon short entitled Whoopass Stew! while in his second year at CalArts. The series made its official debut as a Cartoon Cartoon on November 18, 1998, with the final episode airing on March 25, 2005. The series centers on Blossom, Bubbles, and Buttercup, three kindergarten-aged girls with superpowers. The girls all live in the fictional city of Townsville with their father and creator, a scientist named Professor Utonium, and are frequently called upon by the city's mayor to help fight nearby criminals and other enemies using their powers.

Powerpuff Girls Z (2006–2007)

 is a 2006 Japanese magical girl anime series based on the original The Powerpuff Girls, co-produced by Cartoon Network Japan and Aniplex and animated by Toei Animation. The series featured character designs by Miho Shimogasa, the character designer of Cutie Honey Flash and Ultra Maniac and animation director of Sailor Moon, deviating from the original series in terms of genre and animation style. Powerpuff Girls Z was aired in Japan on TV Tokyo between July 1, 2006, and June 30, 2007. In addition to Cartoon Network Japan, the anime was also broadcast on AT-X.

The Powerpuff Girls (2016–2019)

Cartoon Network announced on June 16, 2014, that a rebooted The Powerpuff Girls was to be produced by Cartoon Network Studios. Amanda Leighton, Kristen Li, and Natalie Palamides were announced as the new voice actors of the main characters, playing Blossom, Bubbles, and Buttercup, respectively, replacing the original voice actors Cathy Cavadini, Tara Strong, and Elizabeth Daily. However, Tom Kenny reprises his roles as the Mayor and narrator, while Tom Kane reprises his roles as Professor Utonium and Him. In April 2016, Jennings revealed that the producers had considered bringing back the original voice actors for the new series, but decided that recasting the roles would infuse new energy. After the network revealed multiple promotional images from the new series in June 2015, writers from news sites described the visual look as similar to the original series, despite the 15th anniversary special Dance Pantsed, which was broadcast on January 20, 2014, featuring a different art style rendered in 3D. Meanwhile, Roger L. Jackson reprises as Mojo Jojo and Jennifer Hale reprises as Ms. Keane, but not as Princess Morbucks. On May 26, 2016, Natalie Palamides confirmed that the series has been renewed for a second season. The reboot had a crossover with Teen Titans Go! that aired on June 30, 2016. On September 17, 2017, a new and fourth Powerpuff Girl named Bliss was added in a 5-part special of the reboot, "The Power of Four". Prior to the announcement, a one-shot footage of Bliss was leaked on Cartoon Network Russia.

Powerpuff pilot (2021)

On August 24, 2020, a live-action television series based on The Powerpuff Girls was announced to be in development at The CW, according to Variety. It would depict Blossom, Bubbles and Buttercup as "disillusioned twentysomethings" resentful at losing their childhood to fighting crime and faced with the choice of reuniting "when the world needs them more than ever." The project, produced by Warner Bros. Television Studios, is written by Heather Regnier and Diablo Cody, who may also serve as executive producers with Greg Berlanti, Sarah Schechter and David Madden. Craig McCracken is not involved; however, he declared his liking of Berlanti's superhero shows and admitted he is "curious" to see what they do with their adaptation. A pilot was officially ordered on February 9, 2021, and Maggie Kiley was hired as the director. Variety later reported that Chloe Bennet, Dove Cameron and Yana Perrault were cast as Blossom, Bubbles, and Buttercup. On March 30, 2021, following the title change to Powerpuff, Donald Faison was cast in the role of Professor Drake Utonium, retaining the character's first name from Powerpuff Girls Z. On April 1, Nicholas Podany was cast as Joseph "Jojo" Mondel Jr., the son of Mojo Jojo. On April 7, 2021, production on the pilot began. On April 9, 2021, Robyn Lively was cast as Sara Bellum and Tom Kenny was confirmed to be reprising his role as the Narrator from the original series.

Second reboot 
On July 18, 2022, a second Powerpuff Girls reboot series was announced with Craig McCracken returning as the creator, director, and producer. This reboot is meant to revisit and expand upon the world of the original series as Blossom, Bubbles and Buttercup face off against a variety of old and new villains, and will be produced by Hanna-Barbera Studios Europe.

Cast and characters

The main characters include Blossom, Bubbles, Buttercup, and Professor Drake Utonium, along with supporting characters Ms. Bellum and the Mayor, and villains Mojo Jojo, HIM, Fuzzy Lumpkins, Princess Morbucks, Sedusa, the Gangreen Gang, the Amoeba Boys, and the Rowdyruff Boys. A fourth Powerpuff Girl, Bliss, was introduced in 2017.

Films

The Powerpuff Girls Movie (2002)

The film serves as a prequel to the series, the film tells the origin story of how the Powerpuff Girls were created and how they came to be the defenders of Townsville.

Specials

The Powerpuff Girls: 'Twas the Fight Before Christmas (2003)

The Christmas special promotes minor antagonist Princess Morbucks to the position of main antagonist, following her as she attempts to trick Santa Claus into physically transforming her into a fourth Powerpuff Girl, while in the process making him believe that the Powerpuff Girls have been "very, very naughty".

The Powerpuff Girls Rule!!! (2009)

In August 2008, McCracken revealed on his DeviantArt account, as had been announced in that year's Comic Con, that he was working with Cartoon Network on a new half-hour Powerpuff Girls special to celebrate the series' tenth anniversary. The 22-minute special, titled "The Powerpuff Girls Rule!!!", aired on the Pan-Euro Cartoon Network on November 29, 2008, on the Powerpuff Girls Birthday Marathon, and in the United States on January 19, 2009, as part of its 10th anniversary marathon. Unlike previous episodes in the series, the anniversary special was animated using Adobe Flash at Cartoon Network Studios. Originally an idea for season 4, the special was meant to be the final episode of the series, but Cartoon Network was against ending their series openly at the time. In March 2012, the series returned to Cartoon Network in reruns on the revived block, Cartoon Planet.

Powerpuff Girls: Dance Pantsed (2014)

On January 28, 2013, a new CGI special titled Powerpuff Girls: Dance Pantsed was announced to premiere that year, though it was later delayed to January 20, 2014, intended to serve as a potential pilot for a new The Powerpuff Girls series. Former Beatle Ringo Starr promoted the special on Cartoon Network, singing a new original song "I Wish I Was a Powerpuff Girl" with previews leading up to the airdate. Ringo also voiced a new character named Fibonacci Sequins in the episode. The special was directed by Dave Smith, who directed episodes for the series in the past, featuring the original cast members reprising their roles. This Powerpuff Girls special marked the first time that series creator Craig McCracken had no input. The main plot sees Mojo Jojo kidnap Fibonacci alongside an opera singer and a badger. After the Powerpuff Girls rescue them all and defeat Mojo, an undeterred Mojo then goes on to invent an evil video game called "Dance Pants R-EVILution" (a parody of the video game Dance Dance Revolution) to take over Townsville.

The Teen Titans Go! and Powerpuff Girls Crossover (2016)

This episode was produced by Warner Bros. Animation primarily in the same art style as Teen Titans Go! despite being an episode of The Powerpuff Girls, making it the first episode produced by a studio other than Cartoon Network Studios since 1998 The Powerpuff Girls series episode "Superfriends". After using a repellent to temporarily hinder Blossom, Bubbles, and Buttercup, Mojo Jojo uses a teleportation device to teleport himself to Jump City in the Teen Titans Go! universe. There, he recruits an oblivious Beast Boy and Cyborg to help him build his monkey army. The girls try to follow him, only to run into Robin, Raven, and Starfire. Rather than showing concern for their predicament, the Titans then proceed to rope the girls into a contest to see who's the better team over the goal of stopping Mojo.

Other media

Shorts

Video games

The game franchise has many different formats. The video games franchise started in 2000 with the release of The Powerpuff Girls: Bad Mojo Jojo for the Game Boy Color, developed by Sennari Interactive, published by BAM! Entertainment and distributed by Cartoon Network Interactive and Warner Bros. Interactive Entertainment.

Comic books
A manga adaptation of Powerpuff Girls Z, illustrated by Shiho Komiyuno, was serialized in Shueisha's Ribon magazine between June 2006 and July 2007.

Developed by Genndy Tartakovsky, The Powerpuff Girls comic series revolves around the continued adventures of the Powerpuff Girls, set during and after the events of the original series. A reboot based on the 2016 series written by Haley Mancini and Jake Goldman was published in July 2016. Each issue of the 2015 IDW Publishing comic miniseries The Powerpuff Girls: Super Smash-Up! features the titular characters teaming up with other characters from Cartoon Network television series such as Dexter's Laboratory, Courage the Cowardly Dog, and Johnny Bravo.

Pony versions of Blossom, Bubbles, and Buttercup appear in the My Little Pony: Friends Forever #14. In Archie & Friends Double Digest #26, Chuck Clayton draws a parody of the Powerpuff Girls called "Riverdale Darlin's". In the Nickelodeon Magazine, an older Bubbles is depicted as an eye surgeon, using her laser eyes to fix the vision of people including Hank Hill and the Joker.

The Powerpuff Girls elsewhere on Cartoon Network

References in other shows
 In the Foster's Home For Imaginary Friends three last part, "House of Bloo's" Mojo Jojo makes a cameo appearance.
 In the Chowder episode "The Hot Date", Miss Bellum makes an appearance as someone's date, proclaiming that she got caught up because "the town" was being attacked again by monsters. In "The Heist" episode, Bubbles's head briefly appears when Mung Daal taste the pink diamond with his tongue. 
 In the Evil Con Carne episode, "Ultimate Evil", Blossom, Bubbles, and Buttercup makes an appearance.
 At the end of The Grim Adventures of Billy and Mandy episode "My Fair Mandy", Grim, Mandy and Billy ended up in the universe of The Powerpuff Girls taking the roles of Blossom, Bubbles, and Buttercup respectively due to the effects of Mandy smiling. Professor Utonium then shows up, mentioning Mojo Jojo (played by Irwin) to have broken into the theatre without paying, before the three go out to stop him. Tom Kenny reprises his role as the Narrator.
 At the end of Codename: Kids Next Door and The Grim Adventures of Billy and Mandy crossover episode, "The Grim Adventures of the KND", Blossom, Bubbles, and Buttercup brielfy appears popping out of the Delightful Reaper.
 In the OK K.O.! Let's Be Heroes "Crossover Nexus", Buttercup makes a cameo appearance as one of the characters Ben Tennyson briefly turns into. The Talking Dog also appears as one of the heroes that were summoned by Strike.
 The Samurai Jack episode "The Samurai Called Jack" partially takes place in the ruins of Townsville, where Aku has enslaved its futuristic dog-creature descendants.
 In the Courage the Cowardly Dog episode "The Ride of the Valkyrise", a The Powerpuff Girls poster appears.
 A crossover parody of The Powerpuff Girls and 2 Broke Girls was done in the second season of the Cartoon Network series MAD, known as "2 Broke Powerpuff Girls". The episode, which aired on January 30, 2012, is of Bubbles and Buttercup, who are broke and work for "Him" in a diner after the show got placed on permanent hiatus. Tara Strong (Bubbles) and Tom Kane ("Him") reprised their roles here. The MAD episode with the parody ranked #26/30 for the week with 1.903 million viewers. Blossom also appears in the sketch "Once Upon a Toon". Mojo Jojo appeared in the sketches "The Celebrity Ape-rentice", "I Am Lorax", and "Who Wore it Better?".
 The 2016 incarnations of Blossom, Bubbles,and Buttercup appeared in "The Grampies", the short accompanying the Uncle Grandpa episode "Pizza Eve", along with other Cartoon Network characters from currently running and ended cartoons. Buttercup had a speaking role in that short.
 At the end of Steven Universe and Uncle Grandpa crossover episode, "Say Uncle", Blossom, Bubbles, and Buttercup's names appears on a list.

Cartoon Network promotion

Bumpers
In a 2004 bumper to promote Samurai Jack and Johnny Bravo, featuring the titular characters of each doing their laundry together, Blossom makes a cameo appearance retrieving her dress from a washing machine, leaving Jack's robes colored pink.

Cartoon Network Universe: FusionFall

The Powerpuff Girls appear in the game as playable characters, with their character designs changed to be more realistic compared to other Cartoon Network properties such as Ben 10. In the game, Bubbles and Blossom work together after Buttercup is apparently killed by Mojo Jojo. While Professor Utonium and Blossom refuse to believe that she is gone, Bubbles is shown to be engulfed in anger and stronger than ever. Blossom also serves as the character mission guide if the main guide is selected as Dexter from Dexter's Laboratory.

Cartoon Network: Punch Time Explosion

The Powerpuff Girls appear in the game as playable characters, with the primary character being Buttercup, freed from the corruption of the Null Void by Chowder and Ben Tennyson. Blossom and Bubbles are "summons" in the game. After the three find Vilgax and are brought to Primus to fight Ultimate Kevin Levin before Vilgax's escape, they are saved by Dexter, who allows them access to a machine he built that allows them to travel between different dimensions, using it to return to Buttercup's own, where she reunited with Blossom and Bubbles, defeating Mojo Jojo on a rampage in a giant robot before their dimension is destroyed, returning home following saving the universe from the Announcer's remote.

Merchandise
Following the success of The Powerpuff Girls animated TV series and films, various The Powerpuff Girls merchandise has been released for general sale. These items include comic books, board games, card games (such as Top Trumps), video games, Lego construction sets, bedding, coloring books, and footwear. All three animated shows have also been released on DVD.

Home video

Toy lines

From 1999 to 2002, Trendmasters made Powerpuff Girls dolls and action figures. From August 21 to October 1, 2000, Subway promoted the series with four toys in their kids' meals. A set of six kids' meal toys was available as part of an April 2001 Dairy Queen promotion, which also included a sweepstakes offering the Powerpuff Girls VHS Boogie Frights. Jack in the Box released six Powerpuff Girls toys in July 2002 as a tie-in for The Powerpuff Girls Movie. On February 10, 2003, Burger King began a four-week promotion featuring The Powerpuff Girls and Dragon Ball Z toys as well as special codes to redeem online for Cartoon Network's Cartoon Orbit. In the United Kingdom the characters of Buttercup and Mojo Jojo were given away in Kellogg's cereal boxes as part of the Cartoon Network Wobble Heads in 2003.

Before the 2016 series premiered, a promotional toy line was announced to be released in 2016 by Spin Master, with more toys released in 2017. The toys include the new 2-in-1 playsets and more. A McDonald's Happy Meal promotion for the series ran from June 14 to July 5, 2016 in the United States, including mini action figures, rings, and collectibles. On August 24, 2018, 2 Lego sets were released in the United States and United Kingdom.

In popular culture

 A 2014 segment of Animation Domination High-Def proposed a live-action reboot of The Powerpuff Girls following them as adults, in the style of the HBO series Girls.
 In the American Dad! episode "The Longest Distance Relationship", Jeff Fischer and Sinbad are briefly transformed into facsimiles of a Rowdyruff Boy and Professor Utonium.
 In Aqua Teen Hunger Force, there's the Powerpuff Mall from Meet Fuzzy Lumpkins. In the episode "Universal Remonster", the Plutonians have a shirt that has a Powerpuff girl that resembles Blossom. In the feature film Aqua Teen Hunger Force Colon Movie Film for Theaters, Meatwad has a Powerpuff Girls parachute.
 In the Drawn Together episode "Foxy vs. The Board of Education", a pregnant Bubbles is seen waiting in the hospital.
 In the Robot Chicken episode "I Love Her", the Powerpuff Girls are shown in a sketch where Professor Utonium accidentally adds cocaine to their recipe in the place of Chemical X.
 In the Saturday Night Live segment "The X Presidents", the Powerpuff Girls beat up George W. Bush, Ronald Reagan, Jimmy Carter, and Gerald Ford for kidnapping SpongeBob SquarePants.
 In the SpongeBob SquarePants episode "Sandy's Nutty Nieces", three girls appear who parody the Powerpuff Girls, named are Macadamia, Hazelnut, and Pistachio.
 In The Simpsons episode, "The Dad Who Knew Too Little", When Homer and Lisa blacken their hairs, Lisa says: "look just like a Powerpuff Girl", making her look like Buttercup. In the episode "Daddicus Finch", Homer references The Powerpuff Girls opening at one point. In the "Bart vs. Itchy & Scratchy", the Powerpuff Girls appears on a poster of Cartoon Women's History. In the episode "Lisa's Belly", the chunky sign crushed three girls who parody the Powerpuff Girls.

References

External links
 
 The Powerpuff Girls on YouTube

 
Cartoon Network franchises
Mass media franchises introduced in 1998
Hanna-Barbera franchises
Television series about parallel universes
Fiction about shapeshifting
Television franchises
American superheroes